Tom Curran or Curren may refer to:

 Tom Curran (cricketer) (born 1995), English cricketer
 Tom Curran (hurler) (1920–2005), Irish hurler
 Tom Curran (medical researcher) (born 1956), Scottish medic
 Tom Curran (rower) (1910–1990), American Olympic rower
 Tom Curren (born 1964), American surfer
 Tom Curren (footballer) (born 1992), Australian rules footballer

See also
 Thomas Curran (disambiguation)